Cinde Station is a station of the Palembang LRT Line 1. located in Ilir Timur I, Palembang.

The station is close to the Cinde Market and the Entrepreneur Monument. The station became one of six stations that opened at the Palembang LRT launch on 1 August 2018.

Station layout

Gallery

References

Palembang
Railway stations in South Sumatra
Railway stations opened in 2018